This is a list of Zeebo video games released in Brazil and Mexico. A total of  video games were released for the Zeebo during its lifespan from 2009 to 2011.  All of these were distributed via digital download.

References

External links
Zeebo Inc. Corporate Website 
Zeebo Brazil Games Page 
Zeebo games list and statistics

 
Video game lists by platform